Jajinci is an urban neighborhood located in the municipality of Voždovac, in Belgrade, Serbia. It was the site of the worst carnage in Serbia during World War II when German occupational forces executed nearly 80,000 people, many of them prisoners of the nearby Banjica concentration camp. Jewish women and children from German Sajmište concentration camp, killed in a special gas truck on their way to Belgrade were also buried here.

Location 
Jajinci is located in the Lipnica creek valley. Once a small village far from downtown Belgrade, Jajinci today has grown into one continuous metropolitan area with the rest of the city. It borders the neighborhoods of Banjica on the north, Kumodraž on the east, and Selo Rakovica on the south. The eastern border of the neighborhood is marked by the Jelezovac creek, which also forms a border with the municipality of Rakovica.

Characteristics 
The settlement spreads from the central street, the Boulevard of Liberation, which starts in central Belgrade (the Slavija square). A former village and separate settlement, Jajinci is today a local community (mesna zajednica) within the municipality of Voždovac. Unlike neighboring Banjica, it was never developed with high modern buildings and remained a settlement of smaller, family houses, but did evolve from agricultural into a typical suburban area with most inhabitants working in Belgrade.

A large rasadnik (nursery garden) is located in the north of the neighborhood, and the "Jajinci" memorial park is in the southern section.

Arrangement of the large forest area within the memorial park began in the 1950s. By 2010, the forested complex covered .

Mala Utrina 
A western sub-settlement of Jajinci located along the lower course of the Lipovica creek, near where it flows into the Jelezovac. It is a direct extension of the rasadnik in the north.

As of 2018, it still lacked proper communal infrastructure.

Maxima 
A southern sub-settlement of Jajinci. Because of luxury houses, mansions and villas, people call this part of Jajinci New Dedinje.

Population 

Jajinci was a separate settlement until 1972 when it was officially annexed into the Belgrade City Proper (uža teritorija grada). In the 20th century it experienced constant population growth until the 1990s. The Yugoslav Wars brought a large influx of refugees, and Jajinci continued to grow in the early 2000s.

World War II 

A former military shooting ground near Jajinci was used by the Nazis as an execution place for almost 80,000 people in the period between 1941–44, most of them Serbs, Jews and Roma. Victims were mostly gathered and sent to the execution by the occupational Nazi forces in Serbia, but also by the Independent State of Croatia authorities and the Serbian Quisling regime. Many of them were prisoners, either Communists or public figures opposing the German occupation, from the Banjica concentration camp, but the detainees and prisoners from Staro Sajmište concentration camp, and Gestapo's and special police prisons. Jajinci is the largest World War II execution site in Serbia.

First arrangement of the area into an open memorial was finished in 1951. A large memorial park, with a monument to the victims, was opened on 20 October 1964, marking the 20th anniversary of the Partisan army entering Belgrade.

City authorities tried to construct the proper memorial for a long time. In 1987, city announced the third design competition for the memorial. Architect Bogdan Bogdanović, head of the commission, noted that such work can't be done in concrete, as suggested by the author, so instead a sculpture of stainless steel was made. It was officially dedicated in 1988.

Green and flat area of the Memorial Park Jajinci served as an open picnic and excursion area for decades, variously used for pets, sunbathing, children's birthdays, sports activities and auto races. Deeming such use of the area with tens of thousands of executed victims buried under the ground anti-civilized, Belgrade Museum of Genocide Victims officially asked the government on 29 December 2021 to become administrator of the memorial. The government remained silent until November 2022 when videos and photos of quads revving engines and speeding over the burial ground surfaced. Though this wasn't the first time it happened, this time it caused a public outcry, and government decided to hand over the memorial park to the museum via the expedited procedure.

References

Sources 

 Mala Prosvetina Enciklopedija, Third edition (1985); Prosveta; 
 Jovan Đ. Marković (1990): Enciklopedijski geografski leksikon Jugoslavije; Svjetlost-Sarajevo; 

Neighborhoods of Belgrade
World War II crimes
Serbia under German occupation